The All-Ireland Senior B Hurling Championship was an annual hurling competition organised by the Gaelic Athletic Association between 1974 and 2004 for the so-called 'weaker' hurling teams in Ireland. The teams now play in the Joe McDonagh Cup (Tier 2 of the All Ireland Championship).

The series of games began every year immediately after the completion of the National Hurling League with the All-Ireland final being played in June or July, initially in Croke Park, Dublin but later in provincial venues around the country and in Britain.

The championship was open to all hurling teams who did not take part in the proper All-Ireland Senior Hurling Championship. It was a knock-out competition whereby once a team lost they were eliminated from the championship.

The title was won by 11 different teams, 6 of which won the title more than once. The all-time record-holders are London, who won the competition 5 times.  The history of the championship was bookended by victories for Kildare, winners of the first title in 1974 and the last in 2004.

Roll of Honour

List of Finals 

 
All-Ireland inter-county hurling championships
Defunct hurling competitions